George Edward "Rock" Phillips was an Australian actor and designer who worked in Australian theatre and film in the early years of the 20th century. For a number of years he was property master for J. C. Williamson Ltd.

Select filmography
For Australia (1915) - art director
Officer 666 (1916) - art director
In the Last Stride (1916) - actor
Australia's Peril (1917) -  - art director, actor, producer
The Monk and the Woman (1917) - art director
The Enemy Within (1918) - art director
The Breaking of the Drought (1920) - art director

References

External links

Rock Phillips Australian theatre credits at AusStage

Australian male stage actors
Australian male silent film actors
Year of birth missing
Date of birth missing
Place of birth missing
Year of death missing
Date of death missing
Place of death missing